Sergei Andreyevich Chepchugov (born 15 July 1985) is a Russian former professional footballer.

Career
He made his professional debut in the Russian Second Division in 2004 for FC Metallurg Krasnoyarsk. On 23 December 2009 PFC CSKA Moscow have signed the goalkeeper from FC Sibir Novosibirsk until 2011.

Honours

Club
CSKA
Russian Premier League (3): 2012–13, 2013–14, 2015–16
Russian Cup (2): 2010–11, 2012–13
Russian Super Cup (2): 2013, 2014

Individual
 Russian First Division best goalkeeper (1): 2009
 Russian Second Division Zone East best goalkeeper (2): 2005, 2007

References 

1985 births
Sportspeople from Krasnoyarsk
Living people
Russian footballers
Association football goalkeepers
Russian expatriate footballers
FC Sibir Novosibirsk players
PFC CSKA Moscow players
Russian Premier League players
FK Rīga players
Expatriate footballers in Latvia
FC Yenisey Krasnoyarsk players